The 2016 Liberty Flames football team represented Liberty University in the 2016 NCAA Division I FCS football season. They were led by fifth-year head coach Turner Gill and played their home games at Williams Stadium. They were a member of the Big South Conference. They finished the season 6–5, 4–1 in Big South play to share the conference championship with Charleston Southern. Despite the conference title, the Flames were not invited to the FCS playoffs.

Schedule

Source: Schedule

Game summaries

Virginia Tech

Jacksonville

SMU

Jacksonville State

Robert Morris

Kennesaw State

Monmouth

Gardner–Webb

Presbyterian

Charleston Southern

Coastal Carolina

Ranking movements

References

Liberty
Liberty Flames football seasons
Big South Conference football champion seasons
Liberty Flames football